The Ukrainian Shooting Federation is the national governing body for ISSF shooting sport disciplines in Ukraine.

History
In May 2022 it was reported that two well known athletes had been killed fighting in the 2022 Russian invasion of Ukraine.
As a Junior, Ivan Bidnyak had medalled at the European Championships in 2005, and had won Ukraine's first shooting quota place to the 2012 Olympic Games. Twenty-one year old Ehor Kihitov was a member of Ukraine's junior team.

In November 2022, Federation President Oleg Volkov called on IOC President Thomas Bach to prevent Russian oligarch Vladimir Lisin from standing for re-election as ISSF President at the 70th General Assembly. This followed calls throughout 2022 for Lisin to step down, following the Russian invasion of Ukraine. Italian  narrowly won the election 136 votes to 127.

World Class Performance
Ukraine has produced a number of Olympic and world class shooters, who have won 9 Olympic shooting medals since 2000.

Shooting Medals at the Summer Olympic Games

References

External links
 
 

Shooting sports organizations
Organizations based in Kyiv
Sports governing bodies in Ukraine